The Wrights is an American country music duo composed of husband and wife Adam Wright and Shannon Wright. Adam Wright is also the nephew of country music artist Alan Jackson.

Adam and Shannon Wright met in 1998 after he filled in for a musician in her band in Atlanta, Georgia. The two started out writing songs together, eventually marrying and moving to Nashville, Tennessee in 2002. Two of the duo's songs can be found on Jackson's 2004 album What I Do.

A year later, the Wrights' debut album, Down This Road, was released on Jackson's personal label, ACR (Alan's Country Records), in association with RCA Records. Adam and Shannon wrote all of the songs on their album. A self-titled, eight-song EP and a second album, In the Summertime, both followed in 2008.

Discography

Albums

Singles

Music videos

References

External links
The Wrights on Myspace

Country music groups from Georgia (U.S. state)
Country music duos
RCA Records artists
Musical groups from Atlanta
Married couples
Musical groups established in 1998
Male–female musical duos